Rafah-e-Aam Society is a neighborhood in the Korangi District in eastern Karachi, Pakistan. It was previously part of Shah Faisal Town, which was an administrative unit that was disbanded in 2011. Its old name was "Allahabad Town". 
Rafah-e-Aam Society's Postal Code is 75210. 

There are several ethnic groups residing in Rafah-e-Aam Society; dominated by around 95% Urdu Speaking (Allahabadi & Biharis) The other 5% of people belonging from other ethnicities including Pakhtuns, Balochis and Punjabis. Over 99% of the population is Muslim.

Rafah-e-Aam Society contains Rafah-e-Aam Park, Ladies Park, Jamia Masjid Mosque, Union Council office, IJK Schooling & Coaching System,  Theory Group Coaching System, Nasra School, United Charter School, The Educators, Johar Park Ground, Rafah-e-Aam Market and a commercial street.

See also
 Punjab Town  
 Al-Falah Society
 Bilal Town

References

External links 
 Karachi website

Neighbourhoods of Karachi
Shah Faisal Town